Josefa Joaquina Sánchez (18 October 1765 - 1813) was a Venezuelan heroine who made the flag of the revolutionary movement, leading her to be considered the (Bordadora de la primera Bandera de Venezuela) "embroiderer of the first flag of Venezuela".

Biography
Born in La Guaira, she was the daughter of Joaquin Sanchez and Juana Bastidas.

On July 27, 1783, she married the Venezuelan military leader José María España with whom she had nine children. Together with her husband, she was involved in the Conspiración de Gual y España that was intended to raise the Venezuelan population and free themselves from Spain. Sanchez was commissioned to copy the documents of the revolutionary movement and make the flags that would be used by the revolutionaries. On May 8, 1799, her husband was killed by the Venezuelan authorities who hung his corpse as a warning to other conspirators. Days before, Sanchez had been questioned by Venezuelan officials regarding España, after a black slave named Rafael España betrayed them.

After the death of her husband, she was arrested and taken to Caracas, where months later, she received a prison sentence for a period of eight years, which she would serve in the Casa Hospicio de Caracas. However, in 1808, under the terms of her sentence, she was banished to Cumaná with her children. Once  the process of independence of Venezuela started, she returned to Venezuela and applied for a pension to the government. She died in 1813 in Cumaná.

References

1765 births
1813 deaths
People from La Guaira
Women in the Venezuelan War of Independence